The Israeli Basketball League Cup is a pre-season professional basketball tournament that is contested between clubs. It has been held in Israel since 2006. It is held during the week before the start of the Israeli Premier League season.  The Israeli League Cup tournament is currently sponsored by Pais Lotto, and therefore it is officially known as the Chance Cup. Previously, the tournament was sponsored by the Toto Winner Organization, and it was known as the Winner Cup, from 2006 to 2009. In 2010, it had no sponsor, and therefore the tournament was named Basketball League Cup.

Competition system
The top eight teams of the previous season's Israeli Premier League compete in this tournament. The tournament uses the knockout system. The teams are scheduled according to their positions in Israel's Premier League.

Finals

Performance by club 
Teams shown in italics are no longer in existence.

Notes

External links 
 Winner Cup 

Israeli Basketball League Cup
Basketball league cup competitions in Europe
Recurring sporting events established in 2006